Željko Simović (Serbian Cyrillic: Жељко Симовић; born 2 February 1967) is a Serbian football manager and former player, who played as a forward.

Club career
Born in Yugoslavia, Simović played in the Yugoslav league for Čukarički. He played for Busan IPark of the South Korean K League, then known as Daewoo Royals. Next, he moved to Greek second division side PAS Giannina, making his league debut on 18 December 1994. He joined Kavala F.C. in January 1996, and would help the club gain promotion to the Greek first division at the end of the season. He scored 12 goals during the 1995–96 Greek second division season.

Simovic spent the next two seasons in the Greek first division, appearing in 27 league matches for Kavala and then 26 matches for Ethnikos Piraeus F.C. In 1999, he played for Panetolikos F.C.

Managerial career
After his playing career ended, Simović began coaching. He was appointed manager of First League of FR Yugoslavia side FK Čukarički in January 2003, after a month as caretaker manager. With the club in the relegation places, he was removed after a short spell in May 2003.

References

External links
 Profile at Strukljeva.net
 

1967 births
Living people
Serbian footballers
Serbian expatriate footballers
Association football forwards
FK Čukarički players
Busan IPark players
K League 1 players
Expatriate footballers in France
Serbian expatriate sportspeople in France
Expatriate footballers in South Korea
PAS Giannina F.C. players
Kavala F.C. players
Ethnikos Piraeus F.C. players
Panetolikos F.C. players
Expatriate footballers in Greece
Serbian expatriate sportspeople in South Korea
Serbian expatriate sportspeople in Greece
Serbian football managers